Hussein Mohamed is a Somali entrepreneur. He is a leader of the Somali business community in Kenya, serving as the Vice Chairman of the Eastleigh Business Association centered in the Eastleigh suburb.

See also
Shire Haji Farah

References

Living people
Ethnic Somali people
Somalian businesspeople
Somalian Muslims
Year of birth missing (living people)